Carmentina polychrysa is a species of sedge moths in the genus Carmentina. It was described by Edward Meyrick in 1934. It is found on Java.

References

External links
 Carmentina polychrysa at Zipcodezoo.com

Moths described in 1934
Glyphipterigidae